Niinsoni Nature Reserve is a nature reserve which is located in Harju County, Estonia.

The area of the nature reserve is 111 ha.

The protected area was founded in 2000 to protect valuable habitat types and threatened species in Anija Parish.

References

Nature reserves in Estonia
Geography of Harju County